Khori Dastoor is an American arts administrator. She is the General Director and CEO of Houston Grand Opera (2021–present) and the former General Director of Opera San José (2019-2021).  

Dastoor has dedicated her career as an arts leader to initiatives surrounding innovation, accessibility, diversity, talent incubation, and fundraising.

Khori Dastoor was raised in Pasadena, California. She holds a bachelor’s degree from the New England Conservatory of Music and a master’s degree from UCLA, where she was the recipient of the Dean's Award for the School of Arts and Architecture. While studying at UCLA she served as a teaching artist with the Education Department at LA Opera.  

Dastoor pursued a career as an operatic soprano before transitioning to a career in arts administration, first on the foundation funding side at the Packard Humanities Institute, and then on the opera leadership side at Opera San José and Houston Grand Opera.

She and her husband are the parents of two young daughters. 

Affiliations  

Khori Dastoor currently serves on the Board of Directors for Opera America, where she is the Co-Chair of the Learning and Leadership Council and a founding member and mentor for the Mentorship Program for Opera Leaders of Color.

She assists with industry efforts to identify young talent as a judge for the Richard Tucker Awards and the Metropolitan Opera’s Eric and Dominique Laffont Competition, and she advocates for artists as a board member of the Symphony, Opera and Ballet Employers Electronic Media Association.

Personal life 
According to Houston Grand Opera’s website, Dastoor’s parents both emigrated to the U.S., her father from India and her mother from Indonesia via Holland. She credits her parents for instilling within her a love for classical music. As a child growing up in Pasadena, Dastoor performed with the LA Children’s Chorus.

Career 
Houston Grand Opera

The Houston Grand Opera (HGO) Board of Directors announced Khori Dastoor’s appointment as General Director and CEO  of the company in June 2021. When she joined HGO, Dastoor became only the fourth General Director in the history of the company, which was founded in 1955.

Prior to Dastoor’s appointment, HGO was led by Artistic and Music Director Patrick Summers and Managing Director Perryn Leech. In 2020 Leech departed for a new position as General Director of Canadian Opera Company, at which time the HGO Board of Directors and Leadership decided to return to a single General Director/CEO instead of a dual leadership model. Dastoor assumed leadership of HGO in August 2021 and moved to Houston full time in December 2021 Summers continues to serve as HGO’s Artistic and Music Director. 

Dastoor’s belief that every member of Houston’s diverse international community deserves access to great art and culture has defined her core priorities for HGO. These include presenting world-class productions and original new works grounded in Houston; cultivating the talents of promising emerging artists from across the globe; and increasing diversity on the stage, in the audience, and within the organization.

During her first full season with the company, in 2021-22, Dastoor oversaw the expansion of online art-sharing initiative HGO Digital to include the first livestream of a company world premiere, The Snowy Day, for viewers in 35 countries.  

Under her leadership HGO commissioned a new, original, mainstage production for its 2022-23 season, Dame Ethel Smyth’s 1906 opera The Wreckers, which represented the first staging of the composer’s forgotten masterpiece by a professional American opera company.  

In February 2023 Dastoor announced that HGO had received the largest gift in its history from Sarah and Ernest Butler, in the form of a new fund within the HGO Endowment valued at $22 million. She also announced that the HGO Studio program for emerging artists would be renamed the Sarah and Ernest Butler Houston Grand Opera Studio.

Dastoor also has announced that for HGO’s 2023-24 season, the company has commissioned mainstage world-premiere opera Intelligence. Created by composer Jake Heggie, librettist Gene Scheer, and director/choreographer Jawole Willa Jo Zollar, the new opera shares the story of a women-run pro-Union spy ring during the Civil War. 

Opera San José

In the spring of 2019, the Opera San José (OSJ) Board of Directors announced the appointment of Dastoor as the company's third General Director, succeeding the retiring Larry Hancock. She assumed the position in the fall of 2019, overseeing all aspects of artistic planning and business operations.  

At OSJ Dastoor’s priorities were renewing the company’s commitment to developing and curating emerging talent and elevating the company as a vibrant artistic incubator in the heart of Silicon Valley.  

The COVID-19 pandemic hit soon after Dastoor took over leadership at OSJ, and she had to cancel the final two operas in the 2019-20 season. She soon founded the Opera San José Artist and Musicians Relief Fund, one of the nation's first initiatives of its kind.  

In June 2020, Dastoor launched the company’s Fred Heiman Digital Media Studio, a new performance/film space that enabled the company to stream high-quality, fully produced operatic performances. Its first offering was Robert Schumann's Dichterliebe (‘A Poet’s Love’) song cycle, which was offered with Spanish and Vietnamese translations, in addition to English, welcoming two of San Jose's largest communities to experience its local art.  

In August 2020, Opera San José announced that its 2020-21 resident artists would quarantine together, allowing them to continue creating work to be shared virtually, performing in digital concerts, recitals, conversations, and fully produced operas created specifically for digital broadcast, as well as educational programming for youths and adults.

During the fall of 2021, after the announcement of her new position at Houston Grand Opera, Dastoor split her time between OSJ and HGO. In November 2021, OSJ made a return to live performance with a critically acclaimed new production of Pursell’s Dido and Aeneas.  

Early Administrative Career

In 2013 Dastoor was named Artistic Advisor to Opera San José under founder Irene Dalis, and in 2015 she became Director of Artistic Planning under General Director Larry Hancock. 

Concurrently, Dastoor served as a member of foundation leadership at the Packard Humanities Institute (PHI), which funds initiatives encompassing arts, music, and archaeology. In this capacity she worked closely with PHI's president and various grantee organizations on a wide range of collaborative projects involving performance, historical conservation, and digital musicology. 

Opera Career  

Dastoor, a retired operatic soprano, first worked with Opera San José as a member of the company’s residence ensemble of principal artists, hired by company founder Irene Dalis.  

As an opera singer, Dastoor enjoyed a career performing throughout the U.S., Europe, and Asia, with credits at companies including LA Opera, Lucerne Opera, Lake George Opera, and the Oregon Shakespeare Festival.

Dastoor’s operatic repertoire included such roles as Gilda (Rigoletto), Pamina (Die Zauberflöte), Sophie (Werther), Adina (L'elisir d'amore), Despina (Così fan tutte), Susanna (Le nozze di Figaro), Micaela (Carmen), Clorinda (La Cenerentola), Manon (Manon), Miss Wordsworth (Albert Herring), Gabrielle (La Vie parisienne), Mabel (The Pirates of Penzance), Lauretta (Gianni Schicchi), Lakmé (Lakmé), Gretel (Hansel and Gretel), Oscar (Un ballo in maschera), Lucia (Lucia di Lammermoor), and Cunegonde (Candide).  

Dastoor’s contemporary repertoire included such premier roles as La Novia in Lorca, Child of the Moon and Mary in the world premiere of Paul Chihara's Magnificat.

References 

Living people
American operatic sopranos
Actresses from Pasadena, California
New England Conservatory alumni
UCLA School of the Arts and Architecture alumni
Musicians from Pasadena, California
Year of birth missing (living people)
Singers from California
Classical musicians from California
21st-century American women
American people of Parsi descent